In mathematics, the connective constant is a numerical quantity associated with self-avoiding walks on a lattice. It is studied in connection with the notion of universality in two-dimensional statistical physics models. While the connective constant depends on the choice of lattice so itself is not universal (similarly to other lattice-dependent quantities such as the critical probability threshold for percolation), it is nonetheless an important quantity that appears in conjectures for universal laws. Furthermore, the mathematical techniques used to understand the connective constant, for example in the recent rigorous proof by Duminil-Copin and Smirnov that the connective constant of the hexagonal lattice has the precise value , may provide clues to a possible approach for attacking other important open problems in the study of self-avoiding walks, notably the conjecture that self-avoiding walks converge in the scaling limit to the Schramm–Loewner evolution.

Definition
The connective constant is defined as follows. Let  denote the number of n-step self-avoiding walks starting from a fixed origin point in the lattice. Since every n + m step self avoiding walk can be decomposed into an n-step self-avoiding walk and an m-step self-avoiding walk, it follows that . Then by applying Fekete's lemma to the logarithm of the above relation, the limit  can be shown to exist. This number  is called the connective constant, and clearly depends on the particular lattice chosen for the walk since  does. For other lattices,  has only been approximated numerically.

Known values

These values are taken from the 1998 Jensen–Guttmann paper  and a more recent paper by Jacobsen, Scullard and Guttmann.
The connective constant of the  lattice, since each step on the hexagonal lattice corresponds to either two or three steps in it, can be expressed exactly as the largest real root of the polynomial

 

given the exact expression for the hexagonal lattice connective constant. More information about these lattices can be found in the percolation threshold article.

Duminil-Copin–Smirnov proof
In 2010, Hugo Duminil-Copin and Stanislav Smirnov published the first rigorous proof of the fact that  for the hexagonal lattice. This had been conjectured by Nienhuis in 1982 as part of a larger study of O(n) models using renormalization techniques. The rigorous proof of this fact came from a program of applying tools from complex analysis to discrete probabilistic models that has also produced impressive results about the Ising model among others. The argument relies on the existence of a parafermionic observable that satisfies half of the discrete Cauchy–Riemann equations for the hexagonal lattice. We modify slightly the definition of a self-avoiding walk by having it start and end on mid-edges between vertices. Let H be the set of all mid-edges of the hexagonal lattice. The aim of the proof is to show that the partition function

 

This immediately implies that .

 

This lemma establishes that the parafermionic observable is divergence-free. It has not been shown to be curl-free, but this would solve several open problems (see conjectures). The proof of this lemma is a clever computation that relies heavily on the geometry of the hexagonal lattice.

(Picture needed.) We embed the hexagonal lattice in the complex plane so that the edge lengths are 1 and the mid-edge in the center of the left hand side is positioned at −1/2.

 

Let  denote the left hand boundary,  the right hand boundary,  the upper boundary, and  the lower boundary. Let

 

By summing the identity

 

 

after another clever computation. Letting , we get a strip domain  and partition functions

 

It was later shown that , but we do not need this for the proof.
We are left with the relation

 .

From here, we can derive the inequality

 

Since , we have established that .

Note that we can bound

 

which implies . 
Finally, it is possible to bound the partition function by the bridge partition functions

 

And so, we have that  as desired.

Conjectures
Nienhuis argued in favor of Flory's prediction that the mean squared displacement of the self-avoiding random walk  satisfies the scaling relation
,

See also
 Percolation threshold

References

External links

Discrete geometry